German submarine U-872 was a long-range Type IXD2 U-boat built for Nazi Germany's Kriegsmarine during World War II.

She was ordered on 25 August 1941, and was laid down on 23 December 1942 at DeSchiMAG AG Weser, Bremen, as yard number 1080. She was launched on 20 October 1943 and commissioned under the command of Oberleutnant zur See Peter-Otmar Grau on 10 February 1944.

Design
German Type IXD2 submarines were considerably larger than the original Type IXs. U-872 had a displacement of  when at the surface and  while submerged. She had two shafts and two  propellers.

U-872 was fitted with six  torpedo tubes (four fitted at the bow and two at the stern), 24 torpedoes, one  SK C/32 naval gun, 150 rounds, and a  Flak M42 with 2575 rounds as well as two  C/30 anti-aircraft guns with 8100 rounds. The boat had a complement of fifty-five.

Service history
On 29 July 1944, U-872 was badly damaged by bombs at Bremen in a USAAF raid. She was taken out of service on 10 August 1944 and broken up.

References

Bibliography

External links

World War II submarines of Germany
German Type IX submarines
Ships built in Bremen (state)
1943 ships
U-boats commissioned in 1944
Maritime incidents in July 1944